Waterkloof Ridge (Afrikaans: "Waterkloofrif") is a residential suburb of the city of Pretoria, South Africa. Originally called Highlands - where so called Coloureds, Blacks & some Indians lived & schooled - before they were displaced to 'separate development areas' as per the South African  National Party Apartheid system, Waterkloof is located to the south of Waterkloof in a leafy area that contains some of the city's most expensive real estate, as is the case in much of the surrounding region.

See also
 AFB Waterkloof, an air force base located just west of Waterkloof Ridge in Centurion, Gauteng.
 Hoërskool Waterkloof, large Afrikaans High School situated between Waterkloof Ridge and Erasmuskloof.

References

Suburbs of Pretoria